is a railway station on the Chikuho Main Line operated by JR Kyushu in Nōgata, Fukuoka Prefecture, Japan.

Lines

Station layout 
The station consists of two side platforms serving two tracks. A station building, of traditional design houses a waiting room and automatic ticket vending machines. The side platforms are not opposed. The side platform across the tracks from the station building was originally an island but track 2 has been removed, leaving the track on the far side. The platforms are linked by a covered footbridge.

Adjacent stations

History 
The station was opened with the name "Ueki" on 20 December 1893 as an additional station on this stretch of track. On 1 October 1897, the Chikuho Kogyo Railway, now renamed the Chikuho Railway, merged with the Kyushu Railway. The station was renamed Chikuzen-Ueki on the same day. After the Kyushu Railway was nationalized on 1 July 1907, Japanese Government Railways (JGR) took over control of the station. On 12 October 1909, the station became part of the Chikuho Main Line. With the privatization of Japanese National Railways (JNR), the successor of JGR, on 1 April 1987, control of the station passed to JR Kyushu.

On 4 March 2017, Chikuzen-Ueki, along with several other stations on the line, became a remotely managed "Smart Support Station".

Passenger statistics
In fiscal 2016, the station was used by an average of 595 passengers daily (boarding passengers only), and it ranked 227th among the busiest stations of JR Kyushu.

References

External links
Chikuzen-Ueki (JR Kyushu)

Railway stations in Fukuoka Prefecture
Railway stations in Japan opened in 1893